The Parliament of India is bicameral. Concurrence of both houses are required to pass any bill. However, the framers of the Constitution of India anticipated situations of deadlock between the Rajya Sabha and the Lok Sabha. Therefore, the Constitution of India provides for Joint sittings of both the Houses to break the deadlock.

The joint sitting of the Parliament is called by the President of India (Article 108) and is presided over by the Speaker of the Lok Sabha or, in their absence, by the Deputy Speaker of the Lok Sabha, or in their absence, the Deputy Chairman of the Rajya Sabha. The Chairperson of the Rajya Sabha, who is the Vice President of India, doesn't preside over the joint session. If any of the above officers are not present then any other member of the Parliament can preside by consensus of both the House.

At present, the Central Hall is used for holding joint sittings of both the houses of parliament, which is also used for address by the President in the commencement of first session after each general election.

Provisions of Constitution
As per Article 108 of Constitution, a Joint session of Parliament can be summoned in the following situations.

If after a Bill has been passed by one House and submitted to the other House—

(a) the Bill is rejected by the other House; or
(b) the Houses have finally disagreed as to the amendments to be made in the Bill; or
(c) more than six months elapse from the date of the reception of the Bill by the other House without the Bill being passed by it, the President may, unless the Bill has elapsed by reason of a dissolution of the House of the People, notify to the Houses by message if they are sitting or by public notification if they are not sitting, their intention to summon them to meet in a joint sitting for the purpose of deliberating and voting on the Bill.

However, in the calculating period of six months, those days are not considered when the house is prorogued or adjourned for more than 4 consecutive days.

If the above conditions are satisfied, the President of India may summon the joint sitting of both the houses of parliament.

Exception to joint sittings
These two bills cannot be referred to a joint sitting:

1. Money Bill

Under the Constitution of India, money bills require the approval of the Lok Sabha only. Rajya Sabha can make recommendations to Lok Sabha, which it is not required to accept. Even if Rajya Sabha doesn't pass a money bill within 14 days, it is deemed to have been passed by both the Houses of Parliament after the expiry of the above period. Therefore, a requirement to summon a joint session can never arise in the case of a money bill.

2. Constitution Amendment Bill

Article 368 of Indian constitution require that constitution of India can be amended by both houses of parliament by 2/3 majority(special majority)
. In case of disagreement between both houses, there is no provision to summon a joint session of parliament.

Bills referred to joint session
Joint Sitting of Indian parliament has been called for only 3 bills:
 Dowry Prohibition Bill, 1961 
 Banking Service Commission (Repeal) Bill, 1978 
 Prevention of Terrorism Bill, 2002

References

 Parliament of India
India